Adelaide João (27 July 1921 – 3 February 2021), born Maria da Glória Pereira da Silva, was a Portuguese actress.

Career
In a career that spanned 60 years she appeared in more than 135 films and television shows starting 1960. She starred in The End of the World, which was screened in the Un Certain Regard section at the 1993 Cannes Film Festival.

She won the Career Awards at the Sophia Awards in 2018. At the time of her death she was living in Casa do Artista, and was reportedly infected with COVID-19 during the pandemic in Portugal.

Selected filmography
 The End of the World (1992)

References

External links
 

1921 births
2021 deaths
Portuguese film actresses
Actresses from Lisbon
Portuguese television actresses
20th-century Portuguese actresses
21st-century Portuguese actresses
Deaths from the COVID-19 pandemic in Portugal